Magnar Mangersnes (31 October 1938 – 9 January 2023) was a Norwegian organist and choral conductor.

Early and personal life
Mangersnes was born in Radøy to Johannes Mikal Mangersnes and Maria Mosevoll. He married Kari Eli Mikkelsen in 1962. He graduated as teacher in 1962, and from the Bergen Musikkonservatorium in 1966.

Career
From 1971 Mangersnes was assigned Organist and Master of the Choristers in the Bergen Cathedral. He established and conducted the choir  from 1971. The choir was awarded Spellemannprisen in 1979 for the album Folketoner i glass og ramme. He has conducted a number of choirs in the Bergen district, and received several awards, including Griegprisen in 1985. He was decorated Knight, First Class of the Order of St. Olav in 2000.

Mangersnes died on 9 January 2023, at the age of 84.

References

External Links
 

1938 births
2023 deaths
People from Radøy
Norwegian organists
Male organists
Norwegian choral conductors
Male conductors (music)
20th-century conductors (music)
21st-century conductors (music)
21st-century organists
20th-century Norwegian male musicians
21st-century Norwegian male musicians